Ramadas Volcanic Centre is a volcano in northeastern Argentina. It is the source of a widespread explosive eruption deposit in northeastern Argentina, the Corte Blanco Tuff which was erupted 8.73 ± 0.25 million years ago. Perlite occurs at the volcanic centre and is actively mined.

Geology and geomorphology

Regional 

It is part of the Central Volcanic Zone of the Andes, a belt of volcanoes spanning Peru, Bolivia, Chile and Argentina. The Central Volcanic Zone includes the Altiplano-Puna volcanic complex, where during the late Miocene large explosive eruptions of silicic composition occurred; Ramadas is part of this volcanic complex. The basement beneath Ramadas is formed by the Puncoviscana Formation of Precambrian-Cambrian age and the site of the volcano coincides with a fault.

The region is formed by the Puna high plateau, the Eastern Cordillera and the Subandean Ranges, the first of which is delimited by faults.

Local 

Much of the volcano is buried by more recent rocks, rendering it difficult to visualize. Presently, streams cross the areal.

Eruption history 

Ramadas is an isolated monogenetic volcano. It is the origin of the Corte Blanco Tuff deposit, a widespread formation generated by a Plinian eruption. This eruption deposited large amounts of pumice and smaller amounts of ignimbrite and pyroclastic surge mainly to the east of the vent. After an initially intense explosive eruption, phreatomagmatic deposits and obsidian were emplaced within a depression that appears to be a caldera. Potassium-argon dating has yielded an age of 8.73 ± 0.25 million years ago for this eruption.

Petrology 

The Corte Blanco Tuff is formed by a peraluminous rhyolite. Red garnet occurs in the form of crystals within the rhyolite; other mineral inclusions are biotite, feldspar, quartz and tourmaline. Monazite and zircon have also been observed.

The Ramadas Volcanic Centre is known for the unusual presence of several formations of perlite-bearing rocks, including a lapilli rich one. This perlite has been quarryed, with two active quarries including Don Joaquin and El Sol.

References

Sources 

 
 
 

Volcanoes of Argentina
Miocene volcanoes
Monogenetic volcanoes